Mateo Correa Magallanes (also known as Mateo Correa, Fr. Correa; July 23, 1866 – February 6, 1927) was a Knight of Columbus, of Council 2140.

Correa was born at Tepechitlán, Zacatecas, Mexico.  He attended the seminary at Zacatecas on a scholarship, in 1881. He was ordained as priest in 1893 at the age of 27. As a young priest, he gave first communion to Miguel Pro who also became a priest and was later martyred. Correa was assigned as a parish priest to Concepción del Oro in 1898, and then to Colotlán in 1908. Following the government's repression of the Catholic Church in 1910, he went into hiding. He was assigned to Valparaíso in 1926.

Martyrdom
In 1927, during the government's continuing persecution of the church, Correa was arrested by soldiers as he was bringing Viaticum to a woman who was an invalid. Accused of being part of the armed Cristero defense, he was jailed in Zacatecas, and then in Durango. On February 5, 1927, Correa was asked by General Eulogio Ortiz to hear the confessions of some imprisoned members of the Cristeros, an uprising of Catholic men who decided to fight back against the persecution of the church led by Mexico's president Plutarco Elias Calles. Correa agreed to administer the Sacrament of Confession to these prisoners, but afterward Ortiz demanded to know what the condemned prisoners had confessed. Correa refused. Ortiz then pointed a gun at Correa's head and threatened him with immediate death. Correa continued to refuse, and at dawn on February 6, 1927, he was taken to the cemetery on the outskirts of Durango and shot through the head.

Canonization
He was beatified by Pope John Paul II on November 22, 1992, and then canonized on May 21, 2000 during the Jubilee of Mexico.

References

External links
 El Pueblo Catolico [español]
 Kirken i Norge [Norwegian]

1866 births
1927 deaths
Mexican Roman Catholic priests
Mexican Roman Catholic saints
20th-century Roman Catholic martyrs
20th-century Christian saints
Beatifications by Pope John Paul II
People from Zacatecas
Religious persecution